The bladder (or urinary bladder) is an organ that collects urine for excretion in animals.

Bladder may also refer to:

Biology
 Artificial urinary bladder, in humans
 Gallbladder, which stores bile for digestion
 Pig bladder, urinary bladder of a domestic pig, with many human uses
 Swim bladder, in bony fishes, an internal organ that helps to control buoyancy (homologous to lungs)
 Urinary bladder (Chinese medicine)

Technology
 Air bladder effect, a special effect used in filmmaking
 Fuel bladder, which stores fuels or other industrial liquids
 Hydration system, sometimes known as a bladder
 Pneumatic bladder, an old technology with many industrial applications
 Waterskin, a traditional container for transporting water

Geography
 Bladder Lake, a lake in Minnesota

See also